Protodiplatyidae is an extinct family of earwigs. It is one of three families in the suborder Archidermaptera, alongside Dermapteridae and Turanovia. Species are known from Jurassic and Early Cretaceous fossils and have unsegmented cerci and tarsi with four to five segments.

Genera
The family includes the following genera:

 Abrderma  - Haifanggou Formation, China, Middle Jurassic (Callovian)
 Aneuroderma  - Haifanggou Formation, China, Callovian
 Archidermapteron  - Karabastau Formation, Kazakhstan, Late Jurassic (Oxfordian)
 Asiodiplatys  - Karabastau Formation, Kazakhstan, Oxfordian
 Barbderma  - Yixian Formation, China, Early Cretaceous (Aptian)
 Longicerciata  - Laiyang Formation China, Aptian
 Microdiplatys  - Karabastau Formation, Kazakhstan, Oxfordian, Itat Formation, Russia, Middle Jurassic (Bathonian)
 Perissoderma  - Haifanggou Formation, China, Callovian
 Protodiplatys  - Karabastau Formation, Kazakhstan, Oxfordian, Gurvan-Eren Formation, Mongolia, Aptian
 Sinoprotodiplatys  - Yixian Formation, China, Aptian

References

External links
 A drawing of the species Asiodiplatys speciousus
 A drawing of the species Dermapteron incerta
 A drawing of the species Archidermapteron martynovi

Prehistoric insect families
Archidermaptera